Hamoudi is a surname. Notable people with the surname include:

Ahmed Hamoudi (born 1990), Egyptian footballer
Ali Hamoudi (born 1986), Iranian footballer
Humam Hamoudi (born 1956), Iraqi politician
Mona Hamoudi (born 1993), Iranian footballer

See also
Hamoudi Mosque, mosque in Djibouti City, Djibouti